= Larisa Sergukhina =

Russian politician (born 1965)

Larisa Sergukhina (born 16 September 1965) is a member of the Novgorod regional parliament for the United Russia party. She has been pictured with Vladimir Putin on several occasions.
